Are You Sequenced? is the thirty-second album by Klaus Schulze. It was originally released in 1996, and in 2006 was the eighteenth Schulze album reissued by Revisited Records. Are You Sequenced? was released after Schulze's Silver Edition and Historic Edition 10-disc CD box sets, technically making this album his fifty-second.

Track listing
All tracks composed by Klaus Schulze.

Disc 1

Disc 2

External links
 Are You Sequenced? at the official site of Klaus Schulze
 

Klaus Schulze albums
1996 albums